Karen Chanloung (born 1 July 1996) is an Italian-Thai cross-country skier.

Career
Chanloung originally competed for Italy and, in 2016 switched to competing for Thailand, as she holds dual citizenship.

2017 Asian Winter Games
Chanloung competed for Thailand at the 2017 Asian Winter Games in Sapporo, Japan. However, her results did not count towards the official results as she had not met the requirements to compete for The team (the minimum amount of time had not been met in waiting to switch to competing for another country).

2018 and 2022 Winter Olympics
Chanloung competed for Thailand at the 2018 Winter Olympics and also participated for Thailand at the 2022 Winter Olympics, where she was one of two flagbearers in the opening ceremony. In both Olympics, Karen and her brother Mark Chanloung were the only cross-country skiers on the team.

References

External links

1996 births
Living people
People from Aosta
Italian female cross-country skiers
Karen Chanloung
Italian people of Thai descent
Karen Chanloung
Karen Chanloung
Cross-country skiers at the 2018 Winter Olympics
Cross-country skiers at the 2022 Winter Olympics
Cross-country skiers at the 2017 Asian Winter Games
Sportspeople from Aosta Valley